The Classical Prose Movement of the late Tang dynasty and the Song dynasty in China advocated clarity and precision rather than the florid pianwen or parallel prose style that had been popular since the Han dynasty. Parallel prose had a rigid structure and came to be criticized for being overly ornate at the expense of content.

The aim of the guwen stylists was to follow the spirit of pre-Han prose rather than to imitate it directly. They used elements of colloquial language to make their writings more direct.

The movement also had political and religious aspects, as Confucian scholars tried to combat the influence of Taoism and Buddhism on the emperors.  Some also saw it as an effective tool to expose the reality of corruption and weakness in the central government.

The first great promoters of the  movement were Han Yu and Liu Zongyuan who were not only great writers but also great theorists, providing the foundation of the movement. Both were enthusiastic to promote the movement and were keen to teach young people so the movement could develop.

After the deaths of Han Yu and Liu Zongyuan, the movement fell into something of a decline, their students writing with such ancient characters as to hinder understanding or neglecting the importance of writing good essays. 
Furthermore, the government only allowed the use of pianwen for official use, so those who want to be officials had to learn that style. 

Ouyang Xiu once again promoted the use of classical prose in the Song dynasty. As many people were dissatisfied with the florid piantiwen style, the Classical Prose Movement reached another peak.

See also
 Chinese literature

Chinese literature
History of literature
Literary movements